Zagora (Berber language: Tazagurt) is a town located in the Draa River valley in the Moroccan region of Drâa-Tafilalet.

On the base of the Zagora mountain the remains of an Almoravid fortress can still be seen. The exact location of the former Almoravid mosque is still a matter of dispute. Each year the moussem (festival) of the Sufi saint moulay Abdelkader Jilali is celebrated at Zagora.

Languages spoken in the city include Moroccan Arabic, Tachelhit and Tamazight.

A sign at the town border states "Tombouctou 52 days", the supposed time it takes to get to Timbuktu, Mali on foot or camel. The original sign has been replaced by a mural painting.

Climate
Zagora has a hot desert climate (Köppen climate classification BWh).

Culture
Zagora is also noted for international events such as the Zagora Marathon and the Nomads Festival in M'Hamid.

Local institutions
The weekly outdoor market (souk) is held on Sunday in the city center.

Features

References

External links 
 Zagora on Agadir portal
 Lexicorient
 Zagora
 Zagora, Souss-Massa-Draâ, Morocco
 Zagora Draa

Populated places in Zagora Province
Zagora, Morocco
Zagora Province